Garrick Olof Ohlsson (born April 3, 1948) is an American classical pianist. He is the only American to have won first prize in the International Chopin Piano Competition, at the VIII competition in 1970. He also won first prize at the Busoni Competition in Italy and the Montreal Piano Competition in Canada. He was awarded the Avery Fisher Prize in 1994 and received the 1998 University Musical Society Distinguished Artist Award in Ann Arbor, Michigan. Ohlsson has also been nominated for three Grammy Awards, winning one in 2008.

Early life
Ohlsson was born in 1948 in White Plains, New York, the only child of a Swedish father and Sicilian-American mother. He began his piano studies at the age of eight at the Music Conservatory of Westchester and, at the age of 13, began studying at the Juilliard School. His musical development has been influenced in completely different ways by a succession of distinguished teachers, most notably Claudio Arrau, Olga Barabini, Tom Lishman, Sascha Gorodnitzki, Rosina Lhévinne and Irma Wolpe. Although Ohlsson is especially noted for his performances of the works of Chopin, Mozart, Beethoven, Liszt and Schubert, his range of repertoire is broad, extending from Bach and Busoni to Copland, Griffes, Debussy, Scriabin, Gershwin, Rachmaninov, and contemporary composers who have written new works for him, such as Norman Dello Joio. Writing in The New York Times, music critic Allan Kozinn has characterized Ohlsson's repertory as "huge."

Career
Ohlsson has performed in North America with symphony orchestras of Atlanta, Charlotte, Cleveland, Philadelphia, Boston, St. Louis, Cincinnati, Minneapolis, Milwaukee, Indianapolis, Houston, Detroit, Baltimore, Pittsburgh, Los Angeles, Seattle, Denver, Washington D.C. and Berkeley, among others, at the National Arts Center, with the St. Paul Chamber Orchestra and with the London Philharmonic at Lincoln Center in New York. He has also accompanied violinist Hilary Hahn and contralto Ewa Podles.

Ohlsson is an avid chamber musician, having collaborated with the Cleveland, Emerson, Takács and Tokyo string quartets, in addition to other ensembles. In 2005–2006, he toured with the Takács Quartet. He is also a founding member of San Francisco's FOG Trio, together with violinist Jorja Fleezanis and cellist Michael Grebanier.

In 2006–2007, he played the opening concert at the Mostly Mozart Festival in New York. He has also performed at the BBC Proms with the Budapest Festival Orchestra. In 2010, he visited Australia and gave concerts in Melbourne.

Among his many recordings, Ohlsson performed Chopin's entire musical output on Hyperion Records–including the complete solo piano music, chamber music, works for piano and orchestra, and songs. In 1989, he recorded Busoni's five-movement Piano Concerto in C major, Op. 39 with the Cleveland Orchestra under Christoph von Dohnányi.  He has also recorded all 32 Beethoven piano sonatas for Bridge Records.

His unusually vast repertoire includes no fewer than eighty concertos. He is also known for his exceptional keyboard stretch (a 12th in the left hand and an 11th in the right).

Shortly after his Chopin competition victory in 1970, he appeared as performing guest on ABC's The Dick Cavett Show on 25 February, 1971. The show also featured actor/singer Sammy Davis Jr., and young Family Affair actress Anissa Jones.

Personal life 

Ohlsson currently lives in San Francisco with his partner, historic preservationist Robert Guter. He is a member of the faculty of the San Francisco Conservatory of Music.

Prizes 
 First Prize, 1966 Ferruccio Busoni International Piano Competition, Bolzano
 First Prize, 1968 Montreal Piano Competition
 First Prize, 1970 VIII International Chopin Piano Competition, Warsaw
 Avery Fisher Prize, 1994
 Grammy Award, 2008
 Jean Gimbel Lane Prize in Piano Performance, 2014, Northwestern University

Discography 
Ohlsson has recorded with the following labels:

 Arabesque Recordings
 RCA Red Seal Records
 Angel Records
 Bridge Records
 BMG
 Decca
 Delos International
 Hänssler Classic
 Hyperion Records - complete works of Chopin
 Nonesuch Records
 Telarc
 EMI Classics
 Connoisseur Society

References

External links 
Garrick Ohlsson's official website
Garrick Ohlsson at Opus3 Artists
, WNCN-FM, September 20, 1981

1948 births
American classical pianists
American male classical pianists
Arabesque Records artists
International Chopin Piano Competition winners
Grammy Award winners
Living people
Prize-winners of the Ferruccio Busoni International Piano Competition
Musicians from New York City
20th-century classical pianists
21st-century classical pianists
20th-century American pianists
21st-century American pianists
American LGBT musicians
LGBT classical musicians
LGBT people from New York (state)
Classical musicians from New York (state)
20th-century American male musicians
21st-century American male musicians